{|

{{Infobox ship characteristics
|Hide header=
|Header caption=
|Ship class=
|Ship displacement=
|Ship length=
|Ship beam= 
|Ship height=
|Ship draught=
|Ship draft=
|Ship power= (CODAG)
|Ship propulsion=1 gas turbine, 2 diesels, 2 shafts
|Ship speed=
Economy 
Maximum 
|Ship range= at 15 knots
|Ship endurance=*21 days with logistic support
10 days autonomous
|Ship complement=93 including aviation officers, with accommodation for up to 106
|Ship sensors=*ADVENT CMS
SMART-S Mk2 search radar
Sonar, GPS, LAN, ECDIS
UniMACS 3000 IPMS
X-band radar, Fire control radar
|Ship EW=Aselsan ARES-2N
Others: Laser/RF systems, ASW jammers, SSTD
|Ship armament=*Guns:
 1 ×  OTO Melara Super Rapid
 2 × 12.7 mm Aselsan STAMP
Anti-surface missiles:
 8 × Atmaca
Anti-aircraft missiles:
 21 × RAM (PDMS)Torpedoes:
 2 × 324 mm Mk.32 triple launchers for Mk.46 torpedoes
|Ship armour=
|Ship armor=
|Ship aircraft=
|Ship aircraft facilities=*Hangar and platform for:
 S-70B Seahawk ASW helicopters
 Unmanned aerial vehicles (UAV)
|Ship notes=Capability of storing armaments, 20 tons of JP-5 aircraft fuel, aerial refueling (HIRF) and maintenance systems
}}
|}

TCG Kınalıada (F-514) is the fourth ship of the  ASW corvettes of the Turkish Navy. Kınalıada was named after Kınalıada Island, a part of the Princes' Islands archipelago in the Sea of Marmara, to the southeast of Istanbul, Turkey.

Designed, developed and built by the Tuzla (Istanbul) Naval Shipyard as a part of the MILGEM project, it was laid down on October 8, 2015 and launched on July 3, 2017.

History
Istanbul Naval Shipyard Command started construction of Kınalıada on October 8, 2015. The first-welding ceremony took place on June 18, 2016. She was launched on July 3, 2017. It was commissioned on September 29, 2019 after having completed sea trials. She was named after Kınalıada, means “Henna Island” in Turkish, an island in the Sea of Marmara.

She has a crew of 93, with space for up to 106.Kınalıada'' is equipped with GENESIS combat management system that controls search and navigation radars, electronic warfare suits, weapons, countermeasures, communication devices, underwater and onboard sensors.< The ship is armed with a single  OTO Melara gun, two ASELSAN STAMP  guns, eight Harpoon missiles, 21 Rolling Airframe Missiles and two  Mark 32 triple launchers for Mark 46 torpedoes. Electronic warfare systems include a dedicated EW radar, laser/RF systems, ASW jammers, and an SSTD system. Communication and navigation systems involve satellite communication, X-band, navigation, fire control and LPI radar, ECDIS, GPS and LAN infrastructure. The radar suite is the SMART-S Mk2, built by Thales. The ship is fitted with sonar developed by the Scientific and Technological Research Council of Turkey.The whole platform is managed by an advanced integrated platform management system.

The ship is capable of carrying Sikorsky S-70 helicopter or unmanned aircraft, along with the associated armaments, 20 tons of JP-5 aircraft fuel, aerial refueling systems and maintenance facilities.

References and notes

External links
Undersecretariat for Defence Industries official website
Turkish Navy official website

Ada-class corvettes of the Turkish Navy
Ships built at Istanbul Naval Shipyard
2017 ships